Meydan-e Sa'at Metro Station is a station on Tabriz Metro Line 1. The station opened on 25 September 2016. It is located in central area of Tabriz, on Sa'at Square. The site in near several landmarks, mainly its namesake Saat Tower.

References

Tabriz Metro stations